The 1988 Cork Senior Football Championship was the 100th staging of the Cork Senior Football Championship since its establishment by the Cork County Board in 1887. The draw for the opening round fixtures took place on 13 December 1987. The championship began on 24 April 1988 and ended on 30 October 1988.

Nemo Rangers entered the championship as the defending champions.

On 30 October 1988, Nemo Rangers won the championship following a 2-08 to 0-10 defeat of Duhallow in the final. This was their ninth championship title overall and their second title in succession.

Duhallow's Niall O'Connor was the championship's top scorer with 1-25.

Team changes

To Championship

Promoted from the Cork Intermediate Football Championship
 Glanmire

From Championship

Regraded to the Cork Intermediate Football Championship
 Passage

Results

First round

Second round

Quarter-finals

Semi-finals

Final

Championship statistics

Top scorers

Top scorers in a single game

Miscellaneous

 Glanmire qualified for the semi-finals of the championship for the very first time.

References

Cork Senior Football Championship